Michael Vincent Lee (born November 29, 1968) is a Republican member of the North Carolina State Senate.

Lee was first appointed to office in August 2014 replacing Thom Goolsby.

He was re-elected at the November 2016 election for a second term, having defeated Democrat Andrew Barnhill 57.35% to 42.65%. He was defeated by Democrat Harper Peterson in the 2018 election and defeated Peterson in a rematch in the 2020 election.

Lee holds a bachelor's degree from the University of North Carolina at Chapel Hill and a law degree from Wake Forest University.

As a lawyer, Lee started his own law firm in 2012.

Electoral history

2022

2020

2018

2016

2014

2010

2008

References

External links
State Senate biography page
Vote Smart bio of Lee

|-

|-

1968 births
Living people
Republican Party North Carolina state senators
University of North Carolina at Chapel Hill alumni
Wake Forest University alumni
North Carolina lawyers
21st-century American politicians